Ectopsocus vachoni is a species of outer barklouse in the family Ectopsocidae. It is found in Africa, Australia, Europe and Northern Asia (excluding China), Central America, North America, and South America.

References

Ectopsocidae
Articles created by Qbugbot
Insects described in 1945